Naira is a village in Srikakulam mandal in Srikakulam district, Andhra Pradesh, India. It is situated at a distance of 15 Km from the district headquarters and 5 Km from Singupuram.

Agricultural College of Naira  is located at village Naira and is affiliated to Acharya N. G. Ranga Agricultural University. Naira is located near the road that connects  Amadalavalasa town to Bhyrisingupuram junction on National Highway-5.

References

Villages in Srikakulam district